Sekayu may refer to:

Places
 Sekayu, Indonesia, a town and the capital of Musi Banyuasin Regency in South Sumatra, Indonesia. 
 Sekayu, Malaysia, a small village in Terengganu, Malaysia.

Language
 Sekayu language, also known as Musi language, a Malayan dialect in South Sumatra.